is a 2020 Japanese romantic drama film written and directed by Shunji Iwai, based on his own novel. It is Iwai's second film based on the novel, following the 2018 Chinese film of the same name. The film stars Takako Matsu, Suzu Hirose, Nana Mori, Ryunosuke Kamiki, Hideaki Anno  and Masaharu Fukuyama.

Cast
 Takako Matsu as Yuri Kishibeno
 Nana Mori as young Yuri Kishibeno / Soyoka Kishibeno
 Masaharu Fukuyama as Kyoshiro Otosaka
 Ryunosuke Kamiki as young Kyoshiro Otosaka
 Suzu Hirose as Ayumi Tono / young Misaki Tono
 Hideaki Anno as Sojiro Kishibeno
 Nagi Furuya as Eito Kishibeno
 Keiko Mizukoshi as Akiko Kishibeno
 Hitoshi Komura as Shojo Hatoba
 Keiichi Suzuki as Kokichi Tono
 Midori Kiuchi as Junko Tono
 Etsushi Toyokawa as Ato
 Miho Nakayama as Sakae

Plot 
A family attends the funeral of Misaki, and during the process, Misaki's sister Yuri, is handed the invite to a school reunion.

Yuri goes along to the reunion to tell them her sister has passed, but everyone assumes it is her and she can't bring herself to tell them otherwise.

While there, Kyoshiro Otosaka speaks to her, and gets her number, telling her that he was in love with her (assuming that she is her sister). They start exchanging letters, and it is revealed that he had a relationship with her, before it broke off and she went out with an abusive man, who fathered her daughter Ayumi. Otosoka became a novelist, and wrote a prize winning novel, Misaki, named after her. 

He ends up meeting Yuri again, and then finally her daughters who take him to pay respects to Misaki, where Ayumi reveals the letters, and the chapters he would send were a source of support for Misaki during their bad times. Otosaka, who hasn't been able to write since, now feels he can and starts writing again.

Release
It was released in Japan by Toho on January 7, 2020.

References

External links
 

2020 romantic drama films
2020s Japanese-language films
Japanese romantic drama films
Films about postal systems
Films about writers
Films set in Miyagi Prefecture
Films directed by Shunji Iwai
Toho films